Jiuhe may refer to:
Jiuhe Township, Jiangxi, a township in Jiangxi Province, China
Jiuhe Township, Zhejiang, a township in Zhejiang Province, China
Jiuhe Road Station, a station of the Hangzhou Metro, China